Mahathir Mohamad formed the second Mahathir cabinet after being invited by Tuanku Ahmad Shah to begin a new government following the 22 April 1982 general election in Malaysia. Prior to the election, Mahathir led (as Prime Minister) the first Mahathir cabinet, a coalition government that consisted of members of the component parties of Barisan Nasional. It was the 10th cabinet of Malaysia formed since independence.

This is a list of the members of the second cabinet of the fourth Prime Minister of Malaysia, Mahathir Mohamad.

Composition

Full members
The federal cabinet consisted of the following ministers:

Deputy ministers

Composition before cabinet dissolution

Full members

Deputy ministers

See also
 Members of the Dewan Rakyat, 6th Malaysian Parliament
 List of parliamentary secretaries of Malaysia#Second Mahathir cabinet

References

Cabinet of Malaysia
1982 establishments in Malaysia
1986 disestablishments in Malaysia
Cabinets established in 1982
Cabinets disestablished in 1986